Little Green Valley is a valley in the San Bernardino Mountains, of San Bernardino County, California. Deep Creek has its source at the head of this valley.

References

Little Green Valley (California)